The Bagnacavallo Madonna is an oil painting by Albrecht Dürer, dating to before 1505. It is now in the Magnani-Rocca Foundation of Traversetolo, in the province of Parma, Italy.

History
The work, also called Madonna del Patrocinio, was discovered after World War II in the Capuchin female convent of Bagnacavallo, in the province of Ravenna.  In  1961 the Italian art historian Roberto Longhi recognized it as by Dürer, and, a few years later, the work was acquired by the collection currently owning it.

It could be one of the works carried by  Dürer with him from Germany in his second trip to Italy in 1505, which he used to fund his expenses. A 1495 preparatory drawing is known, copied from a Child Jesus by Lorenzo di Credi (perhaps seen by the German artist in Venice). Mary's features resemble those of Giovanni Bellini's works, which were also present in Dürer's work from the same period, such as the Haller Madonna.

Description
The scene is set in a dark room with, on the left, a window shut with wooden planks and, on the right, an arch leading to a walled enclosure (symbolizing the hortus conclusus). Mary is seen half-figure with the Child in her lap. The latter's left hand is touching his mother's, while the other holds a sprig of fruit-bearing strawberry plant, one of the symbolic plants of the Triune. The plant the Child holds has only two leaves in the strawberry three-leaf configuration. The missing leaf on the plant indicates the last person of the Trinity in the Child.

Sources

Paintings by Albrecht Dürer
1500s paintings
Paintings of the Madonna and Child
Paintings in the collection of the Magnani-Rocca Foundation